Honda Canada  may refer to:

 Honda Canada Inc., distributor
 Honda of Canada Manufacturing, manufacturer